Robert Burns Memorial may refer to:

 Robert Burns Memorial (Montreal), Quebec, Canada
 Robert Burns Memorial (Barre), Vermont
 Robert Burns Memorial, Stanley Park, Vancouver, British Columbia, Canada

See also
List of Robert Burns memorials